The Andong Tunnel is a tunnel in Dongyin Township, Lienchiang County, Taiwan.

History
The tunnel was constructed in the 1970s by the Republic of China Armed Forces during the cold war with People's Liberation Army. In 2002, the tunnel was transferred to Matsu National Scenic Area Administration and subsequently renovated. It was finally opened to the public in 2004.

Architecture
The tunnel path was constructed with 30 degrees angle downwards with 464 steps at a length of 260 meters. The tunnel itself is 640 meters long. It features military utilities, such as dormitories, ammunition depots, viewing platform etc.

Geology
The tunnel was constructed through Mount Erchong.

See also
 List of tourist attractions in Taiwan

References

Dongyin Township
Military history of Taiwan
Tunnels in Lienchiang County
Tunnel warfare